Flags of the Nguyễn dynasty's administrative units were used since about 1868 to 1885, with 1:1 ratio.

Northern Region (北圻之省)

Right Region (右圻之省)

Straight Region (直圻之省)

Left Region (左圻之省)

See also

 Provinces of Vietnam
 Flags of the subjects of Vietnam
 List of flags of Vietnam

References

Sources  

 Peter Truhart, Regents of Nations, K.G Saur Münich, 1984–1988 , Art. «Vietnamese Dynasties/Vietnamesische Dynastien», pp. 1786–1790.
 The star icon in Vietnamese consciousness (TTXVA.NET). 
 Hervé Calvarin, Olivier Corre: L'Indochine. Étude d'Histoire vexillologique. In: Franciae Vexilla. (Bulletin de la Société Française de Vexillologie) Numéro spécial 2005, 20e anniversaire de la Société Française de Vexillologie-SFV, S. 89-126; 147-162. (in French).  

 

Symbols of Nguyen dynasty
Flags of Vietnam
Vietnamese symbols by subdivision